Pustelnik may refer to the following places in Poland:
Pustelnik, Lower Silesian Voivodeship (south-west Poland)
Pustelnik, Lublin Voivodeship (east Poland)
Pustelnik, Łódź Voivodeship (central Poland)
Pustelnik, Marki — part of the Marki city
Pustelnik, Mińsk County in Masovian Voivodeship (east-central Poland)
Pustelnik, Sokołów County in Masovian Voivodeship (east-central Poland)